Up & Down – The Party Album! is the debut studio album of Dutch dance group Vengaboys. It was released in the Netherlands in April 1998 by Breakin' Records. Four singles were released off the album: "Parada de Tettas" and "To Brazil" in 1997, and "Up & Down" and "We Like to Party (The Vengabus)" in 1998. The album was later re-released internationally under the title The Party Album!. Some press cited that all of the singles of this album were also singles of the re-released album.

Track listings

Charts

Certifications

References

1998 debut albums
Vengaboys albums